This is a list of characters in the American animated television series Metalocalypse. Survival from near fatal injuries in the show is a common running gag; a character may be burned, maimed or hurt in some manner and still be able to return in later episodes.

Dethklok

Dethklok is depicted as an extremely popular and successful death metal band, described by their adversaries, the Tribunal, as the "world's greatest cultural force." The band has five members: frontman and lead vocalist Nathan Explosion, lead guitarist Skwisgaar Skwigelf, rhythm guitarist Toki Wartooth, drummer "Pickles the drummer", and bassist William Murderface.

The band's fan base includes billions of metal fanatics, who frequently endanger themselves to watch the band perform live. With their widespread commercial success and lucrative sponsorship contracts, Dethklok is ranked as the world's seventh largest economy (by the end of the second season).

The members of Dethklok are often portrayed as incompetent at almost everything not directly related to their profession. The band struggles to perform everyday tasks, including shopping for groceries, preparing food, and maintaining proper social relationships.

The Tribunal

The Tribunal is an Illuminati-style group which monitors Dethklok. They appear in almost every episode to discuss Dethklok's latest activities and the dangers they pose. They seem to fear that Dethklok are part of an ancient Sumerian prophecy. In an early version of the Metalocalypse theme song posted on Brendon Small's personal website, the voice snippets suggest that a "death clock" would be discovered and used by the members of the band. The episode "The Metalocalypse Has Begun" suggests that the ultimate event in the prophecy is an "apocalypse of metal."

The group's briefings are led by Senator Stampingston, who usually has experts (who often bear ridiculously complicated names) speak based on whatever Dethklok is doing in the episode. The group has both military (General Crozier) and religious (Cardinal Ravenwood, replaced by Vater Orlaag in season 2) leaders in its ranks, among others. At its head is Mr. Salacia, a gray-haired man who sits in a throne in the center. There are four other members, but none of them have been named and only one of them has spoken so far (requesting to go to the United States Pornography Awards, along with Stampington, Crozier, and Ravenwood). Behind the sitting members of the Tribunal are monitors showing the faces of eight more men appearing via video conferencing. The room the group meets in also becomes progressively larger and more elaborate as the series progresses.

Senator Stampingston
 Voiced by: Mark Hamill
Senator Stampingston is the main speaker who reports on Dethklok's current activities. It's never made clear if he currently represents a state or if he simply was a past senator. He stands to the side of the large television screen in the briefing room, explaining Dethklok's latest activities while the screen highlights his points. When his back is seen, there is a long scar on the back of his head. He has a diplomatic standpoint for the issues against Dethklok, often recommending espionage and other forms of information gathering. He keeps a professional and calm attitude towards Dethklok; he knows they are a threat, but he never overreacts and he is rarely the one who comes up with ideas.

General Crozier
 Voiced by: Victor Brandt
General Crozier was the main villain of the first season and a four-star General in the United States Army; as of the end of Season 2, he has become Chairman of the Joint Chiefs of Staff. His job in the Tribunal, as stated by Mr. Salacia, is information gathering, which Crozier is not happy about. He brings a military viewpoint to the Tribunal's dealings with Dethklok, and usually recommends military action, often in the form of assassination. Despite his view that Dethklok should be dealt with in the most efficient manner, he usually has the most realistic predictions, sometimes questioning if certain things the band does are really dangerous. However, during the Season 1 finale, his attempt to kill Dethklok is halted when Salacia uses his mysterious mental powers to erase Crozier's memories of the events and later is converted into Salacia's thrall during the Season 2 finale. Under Salacia's control, Crozier gathers his forces to set up the Falconback Project.

Cardinal Ravenwood
 Voiced by: Victor Brandt
Cardinal Ravenwood was an elderly priest who had a religious perspective on the issues regarding Dethklok. He was the secondary villain of the first Season. He claimed to have prophetic visions on a regular basis, most of which related to Dethklok; however, they did not appear to be very reliable, or at the very least not as literal as he explained them. Though his visions did not usually end up accurate, he did accurately foretell his own death. In the season 1 finale, Salacia discovers Ravenwood and Crozier's attack on Dethklok, and uses his telekinetic powers to kill Ravenwood by making him vomit his intestines.

Vater Orlaag
 Voiced by: Malcolm McDowell
Vater Orlaag is introduced in the second episode of the second season, presumably having been taken on to replace Ravenwood. Orlaag is described by Stampingston as "a political and spiritual specialist." Orlaag appears to play a strong role in the Tribunal, often giving his input during meetings and being present in Salacia's chamber during a conference with Crozier. He seems to either hold a high military rank or maintain a private army. He has also shown himself to be fiercely loyal to Salacia, more so than any other Tribunal member, and is later revealed to have been working under him. He also appears to have the ability to communicate telepathically with Salacia. His appearance is similar to Rasputin.

Mr. Salacia
 Voiced by: Mark Hamill
Mr. Salacia is the oldest and most powerful member of the Tribunal, sitting in a throne in the center. He also acts as the main antagonist of the series. When the Tribunal debates the best course of action, Mr. Salacia is usually the last to speak, and always has the final word on what course of action the group will take. Oddly enough, he usually recommends inaction, ordering the Tribunal to allow what is occurring to take place undisturbed. General Crozier describes Salacia's background as "murky." It is heavily implied throughout the series that Salacia is connected to Dethklok and the Metalocalypse, although it remains uncertain as to exactly how. Salacia possesses a variety of powers ranging from telekinesis and mind control to flight, size changing, and lightning manipulation. Overall, Salacia's true demonic nature is known to only a few like Orlaag.

Salacia frequently makes it a point to not kill Dethklok, something that angers both General Crozier and Cardinal Ravenwood in the first season. In the season 1 finale, when the pair violate his order, Salacia kills Ravenwood while sparing Crozier, wiping the general's memory of the ordeal. In the Season 2 finale, Salacia uses his psychic powers to possess General Crozier and turn him into his pawn. In Season 3, Salacia becomes concerned by Offdensen's return to the living, suspecting that Offdensen is now aware of his true nature. Salacia declares Offdensen a "Dead Man" in the tribunal. In the Season 4 finale it is revealed that Salacia could no longer see Offdensen because he had died. This gave Offdensen the opportunity to act effectively as a spy during the time he was presumed dead. Near the end of Season 4, with Dethklok disbanding, Salacia decides to finally make his move during the band's final concert in Iceland, killing a portion of audience as well as Roy Cornickelson. After Offdensen facilitates Dethklok's escape, he reveals that Salacia is "not like us," referring to him as "The Half-Man."

Dethklok employees

Charles Foster Offdensen 
 Voiced by: Brendon Small
Charles Foster Offdensen (inconsistently spelled with one or two 'f's) is Dethklok's manager, legal counsel, and Chief Financial Officer, the latter also incidentally being his initials. He acts as manager, lawyer, and advisor to Dethklok, protecting the band against everything from slowing record sales to themselves. Offdensen is one of the few individuals seen to interact with Dethklok for a significant length of time and evade subsequent mutilation or death (until the end of season 2). Offdensen is an excellent fencer; his office displays a plaque he earned in college for his achievements. He is also highly proficient in other martial arts; in several episodes he is seen standing his ground, and twice defeats a highly skilled and brutal assassin who had come to kill Dethklok. Offdensen uses high-tech radar and surveillance to monitor the band's safety, and activates cutting edge defenses when Dethklok is attacked.

Offdensen is focused on business; his primary concern is getting the band to record and perform, but he must also protect the band from fans, enemies, and the legal and financial ramifications of their own actions.  To this end, he has shown himself capable of brutality. However, his violent acts are always quite calculated, with the clear objective to protect the band, as opposed to the accidental carnage the band members themselves seem to attract by simply existing.

Over the course of the series, Offdensen is portrayed as a sort of caretaker to Dethklok, having a clear knowledge of the various band members' personalities and quirks. He receives a great deal of verbal abuse from the band, which he bears with visible—but controlled—annoyance while continuing to indulge them. At times he attempts to reason with the band about their disregard of law and logic. At other times, he enables their behavior. When he sees a situation that is immaterial to Dethklok's making music or other money-making enterprises (e.g. Dethmerch, the merchandise line of Dethklok), he half-heartedly offers a listening ear for advice. In a deleted scene from Season 2, after defeating and dismissing their more laid-back second manager, Offdensen is pressured into getting drunk by the band, and he spends the night partying with them.

In season 2, Offdensen became the target of the Metal-Masked Assassin after stopping him from killing Dethklok, fighting him until the event of the Revengencers attacking Mordhaus itself during the CD release party for the band's new album. During the ensuing battle, after Offdensen is shot down by the Death Mask teenager, the Assassin brutally beats him and promises him torture. At the last possible moment, Nathan Explosion clubs the Assassin, ending the episode and season with Offdensen presumed dead. In reality, having witnessed Salacia brainwashing General Crozier, Offdensen was cursed with his soul separated from his body. However, the Church of the Black Klok saved him before he suddenly reappears just in time to save the band from signing a contract that would ultimately end their careers. He tells the band that he had presumed himself dead but has returned to help them get back on their feet and promises to tell them everything when the time is right. As seasons 3 and 4 progress, understanding that Dethklok's music can enable people to survive the end of the world, Offdensen returns to his job and tasks of seeing over the band as if nothing had happened, save for being slightly more vigilant in his business handling. He even holds Edgar Jomfru in Mordhaus's basement to help him. Because his soul had been separated from his body, Offdensen is labeled as "The Dead Man" and could no longer be seen by Salacia, who sees him as a major threat with possible knowledge of his true nature.

In Metalocalypse: The Doomstar Requiem, Offdensen resigns from his position as Manager and CFO of Dethklok, and becomes the new High Holy Priest of the Church of the Black Klok, after the death of Ishnifus Meaddle.

Klokateers

Klokateers are the slavishly devoted servants of Dethklok, providing for their every need, such as maintaining the band's various properties, serving as soldiers  and bodyguards, and performing as roadies for their concerts and their own personal military and police force. They wear black hoods and black, sleeveless uniforms, and in general resemble medieval executioners. In order to prove their loyalty to Dethklok, Klokateers have a Dethklok gear emblem branded onto the backs of their necks. They always refer to the members of Dethklok as "my lord(s)" or "my master(s)" and are in turn referred to by their numeric designation. They are killed as frequently as any other people who come into contact with Dethklok, if not more so. Klokateers are generally all male, though there are a division of female Klokateers, as revealed in the third season.

The Klokateers obey Dethklok without question, no matter how outrageous the demand, and are willing to give up their lives for the band. They are quick to beat or kill people, with or without orders, and can also function as an army. Even before they are officially hired, they are quite likely to die. The entrance exam alone has a mortality rate of fifty percent, as the participants are required to pair up and fight each other to the death with their bare fists. Offdensen mentions that, by the time they are made official Klokateers, most will likely have been maimed or killed. Their living conditions are said to be so horrible that their corpses are stuffing the Mordhaus sewer system, which the band notes as being "metal".

Most Klokateers are generic-looking and unnamed. However, one Klokateer in particular is given an identity which makes him easily recognizable in future episodes: Number 216, who is a dwarf. His appearance could be considered an "easter egg" in the series.

The first use of the term to represent Dethklok's massive gang of henchmen is in The Dethalbum. In the liner notes, Dethklok states their appreciation of their labor, saying "DETHKLOK would like to thank the tireless work of the Klokateers (see we really are good bosses)." "Dethsources" features the first use of the name "Klokateers" within the animated series.

For the live band, Dethklok's roadies are often dressed in the same fashion as the Klokateers, with a black garb wrapped around their head to achieve a similar look.

Jean-Pierre

 Voiced by: Mark Hamill
Jean-Pierre is Dethklok's stereotypical French chef, the most recent in a long line to cater to the band. He is passionately loyal to his employers, having stated he "would rather have [his] brains scooped out with a melon baller than miss the opportunity to serve the various cheese snacks to [his] beloved Dethklok", despite the job's inherent risks. All chefs previously employed by Dethklok died in various incidents including one who shot himself (a photo of which is used on an unspecified album cover, a possible reference to the Mayhem bootleg album Dawn of the Black Hearts which used a photograph of the then lead vocalist after committing suicide) and another whose face was "smashed in by a hovercraft".

In the pilot episode, Jean-Pierre was mangled when a stray firework missile ejected him from the Dethcopter and into its rotor blades. The blades sliced him into several pieces, making it necessary to connect them together via a complex and strange-looking machine in order to keep him alive. The band incompetently sewed him back together, giving Jean-Pierre a grotesque and mutilated appearance (some parts don't quite fit and/or were sewn on backward). Despite the dubious quality of his reconstruction Jean-Pierre returned to work enthusiastically, and his current condition does not appear to have adversely affected his skills as a chef. He can be seen in the background of various episodes, shuffling along. He has avoided additional accidents since.

Dick "Magic Ears" Knubbler
 Voiced by: Brendon Small
Dick Knubbler is Dethklok's music producer/engineer. He has a criminal history; among his laundry list of felonies are tax evasion, disfiguring a co-worker's face with acid, soliciting prostitution and drugs. Initially working for the Tribunal to clear his record, he instead fell in love with Dethklok's music. His eyes exploded from a rapid decompression accident, and were replaced with new "dark metal" robotic eyes. The character has continued as Dethklok's patient producer, avoiding accidents since then. Though his music producing later ended when Crystal Mountain Records fired him in Season 4, his replacement Abigail Remeltindrinc hires him back as the band's main engineer.

Knubbler may be a parody of Phil Spector, although his appearance is similar to recording engineer Chuck Ainlay. The Dethalbum, Dethalbum II and Dethalbum III credit Knubbler with producing, engineering, and mixing.

Dr. Johnathan Twinkletits
 Voiced by: Brendon Small
Dr. Johnathan Twinkletits (pronounced twink-LET-its, deliberately avoiding the obvious pronunciation) is an insane band therapist, and parody of performance coach Phil Towle and producer Bob Rock. He was formerly a member of a 1980s pop band known as the Amazelingtons, whom he killed. He is later hired by Dethklok to help them get along with each other until he tries to nudge his way into Dethklok, fired before his attempt to murder them results with him falling through a window into a pit of wolves who rip his arms off. He has since returned as a therapist for Mordhaus with new robotic arms.

Dethklok's doctor
 Voiced by: Tommy Blacha 
Dethklok meets a certain unnamed doctor at various points in the series. The doctor usually does whatever Dethklok asks, despite the fact that they ask him to do things any ordinary doctor would never consider including the assumably forced castration of "Fat Kid", the band's adopted son. He usually responds to their requests with a dejected "whatever."

Facebones
 Voiced by: Brendon Small
Facebones is an animated version of the Dethklok logo, with a twisted jaw and visible brain (most likely a nod to metal mascots such as Megadeth's Vic Rattlehead, or Iron Maiden's Eddie the Head). Facebones speaks in a high-pitch voice that occasionally modulates into something deeper and more demonic. He is used in videos related to Dethklok, like during fan day, when he told the fans the rules. He also appears in "Murdering Outside the Box," to open the quarterly review.

Outside of fiction, Facebones is used to host video segments in interludes at Dethklok's live concerts.  The videos are projected onto a large screen and provide mock 'behind-the-scenes' information. He also appears in the video for Bloodrocuted as an artifact from which the video's protagonist gains power.

Facebones is known to malfunction time to time, where the screen becomes scrambled, usually right as he is about to dispense some important information that has deadly consequences to the Klokateers and fans.

#216
216 is a Klokateer that is best known for his dwarfism. Introduced in "Murdering outside the Box", he got into a scuffle with a disguised Agent 216 (an assassin sent by General Crozier to kill Dethklok) over who had won the company's raffle draw. The resulting fight between the two lead to #216 being incapacitated; yet, #216 managed to deliver the final blow, tripping Agent 216 before he could kill the band, leading to the assassin's death via cranial impalement on Murderface's diamond-encrusted rhinoceros horn codpiece. He is later seen at the end of the episode in a wheel chair, with an oxygen mask and the codpiece that he won in the raffle.

By the events of "The metalocalypse has begun", #216 had fully recovered from his injuries, and took part in the massive battle between General Crozier's armed forces and the Klokateer Army. His weapon of choice during the battle appeared to be his diamond encrusted codpiece. The battle was close, and while #216 and the Klokateers fought valiantly, they were narrowly defeated. While many Klokateers died during the battle, #216 survived. He is later seen in seasons 2 and 3, and briefly during the Doomstar Requiem, a Klok Opera.

Mordhaus Scientists
Voiced by: Brendon Small and Tommy Blacha
Two intelligent and silly scientists who work for Dethklok and create technology for them. They frequently display an inability to present information in an organized manner, often interrupting each other and talking at the same time when explaining new technologies that they have developed.

Abigail Remeltindtdrinc
Voiced by: Janeane Garofalo, Raya Yarbrough (singing)
A new producer for Dethklok after Crystal Mountain Records was unhappy with the performance of Dick Knubbler (she later hires Dick back as the band's main engineer). In the episode "Going Downklok", Nathan and Pickles develop a rivalry over their attractive co-worker. During the band's recording segregation, Nathan goes down on Abigail in the heat of the moment, but she expresses regret and quickly leaves. Distancing herself from Dethklok, she is shocked during "Dethdinner" when Nathan claims the two are a couple. Pickles has a meltdown and quits the band, setting the stage for Dethklok's breakup and Salacia's rise.

The Tribunal foresaw a woman being the wedge between the band very early in season 4.

In the finale, "The Church of the Black Klok", Abigail is abducted by the Revengencers (as is Toki Wartooth). However, as the Dethsub escapes, Ishnifus believes her and Toki to still be alive.

In Metalocalypse: The Doomstar Requiem, Abigail and Toki are held captive by the Revengencers but rescued by Dethklok. During the credits, Abigail and Nathan share a kiss.

Recurring characters

Dr. Rockso
 Voiced by: Tommy Blacha, Brendon Small (singing)

Dr. Rockso (inconsistently spelled with an "s" or "z") is a self-described "rock and roll clown" and he does cocaine. He is known for his frequent use of cocaine, excessive lifestyle, and his trademark introduction and catchphrase: "I'm Dr. Rockso, the rock and roll clown! I do cocaine!". He admits in "Cleanso" that not only does he use cocaine, but also huffs paint, uses crystal meth, heroin, pain pills, and OxyContin before stating, "I do it all." He once attempted to rob a Colombian drug cartel and was maimed in the process, described by Nathan as, "Now he pees out of the side of his dick." Dr. Rockso's past was originally a mystery, and even the Tribunal could not find out anything about him other than he was the rock and roll clown, and that he does cocaine. Dr. Rockso's real name is Leonard Rockstein;  the hyperactive son of a physical therapist.  Rockso began his music career as the lead singer of Zazz Blammymatazz, a partying glam-rock band named after the guitarist, Bink Bonk Blammymatazz. The logo of Zazz Blammymatazz is a stylized parody of Van Halen's logo. The band quickly became successful; however, Rockso insisted on being paid in cocaine, and was fired for his violent and erratic behavior. After a short-lived solo career, he began his present life working as a clown for parties. In Dethzazz, it's revealed that the second reason he was kicked out was because he had a sexual affair with a fourteen-year-old girl named Dory Mclean and even wrote a song about it.

Rockso talks in a high-pitched voice, with an occasional, oddly exaggerated stutter, which every member of Dethklok except Toki finds irritating. He wears a very tight neon unitard with cutouts that expose almost his entire torso and, in the back, the top of his buttcrack and outline of his testicles. The rest of his outfit includes a combination cap, long, thick, brightly colored hair, KISS-like face paint, spiky wristbands, furry boots, and a spiky red nose. The colors of his clothing and hair change between episodes, but are always gaudy and fluorescent. It is suggested that he is an ephebophile; he was once arrested for having sexual relations with a minor.

Rockso seems to be a parody of various events and persons. According to Brendon Small, Dr. Rockso was supposed to be an amalgam of every kind of front man from the hard-rock era, including Vince Neil, Axl Rose, and Bret Michaels. Eventually the animators made him resemble David Lee Roth.

Dethklok Minute Host
 Voiced by: Tommy Blacha
The Dethklok Minute focuses on Dethklok's usual celebrity stunts such as TV appearances, movies, romances, rumors, and so on. The right side of the host's face is disfigured when a meteor fragment strikes his studio at the end of "P.R. Klok," but it hasn't dampened his enthusiasm about reporting on Dethklok's activities. Prior to being maimed by the meteor fragment, the character bore a strong resemblance to Mark McGrath although the original character design was based on the show's producer Keith Fay.

Ishnifus Meaddle
 Voiced by: Werner Herzog, Brendon Small (singing)
Ishnifus is the High Holy Priest to the Church of the Black Klok. Throughout the fourth season of the show he gives narration and dictates prophecies regarding Dethklok. In Metalocalypse: The Doomstar Requiem, he helps Dethklok in their search for Toki. During Dethklok's encounter with the Metal Masked Assassin he sacrifices his life to create a distraction so that Dethklok could escape. He was subsequently beheaded by the Metal Masked Assassin and crucified.

Pickles' Family
 Voiced by: Laraine Newman (Molly), Matt Pike (Calvert), and Brendon Small (Seth)
Pickles' family resides in Tomahawk, Wisconsin. His parents are Calvert and Molly, who very obviously favor Pickles' brother Seth due to the fact that he is more easily controlled than his financially independent brother. Seth is an ex-con, has no known job, and lives in his parents' garage, and later in a "house room" in their attic. While Pickles initially tried to earn his mother's affection by becoming the best real estate agent in the country, he eventually takes his bandmates' advice and stops caring what she thinks, coming out much better for it. Seth constantly tries to make money from Pickles' fame, even threatening Pickles with identity theft. Eventually Seth was made head of Dethklok Australia, mostly out of Pickles' hatred: The previous managers had been gruesomely murdered at some point, being a highly dangerous position. Seth, however, used the power of his position to reallocate Australia's resources—mainly to protect himself, leaving most of Australia in chaos. Pickles later realizes that the main reason he drinks is to deal with the fact that at age 6, Seth burned down the garage of their house, and blamed it on Pickles. In order to complete his 12-step rehab to rejoin the band, Pickles needs Seth to accept his forgiveness, which he does only when Pickles gives him $5 million.

Toki's Family
Toki's parents are Anja Wartooth and the now deceased Reverend Aslaug Wartooth, two extremely religious people who never speak, smile, or show any emotion whatsoever. They live in an abandoned village near Lillehammer, Norway. They were very harsh and even cruel to Toki during his childhood, forcing him to perform incredibly strenuous tasks for a child such as moving rocks, symmetrically stacking huge amounts of firewood and "sweepings the snow". They would reprimand Toki for the slightest mistakes with beatings and solitary confinement in a "punishment hole". This harsh childhood is implied to be why Toki acts the way he does, using his newfound fiscal independence as a member of Dethklok to live out the childhood he wished he had.

In "Dethdad", Toki's triumphant trek up the mountain, the rest of the band's refusal to accompany him, and the small house at the summit closely resemble events in the documentary film True Norwegian Black Metal. In the documentary, black metal vocalist Gaahl takes the American documentarians on a long walk up a snow-covered Norwegian mountain to show them a house he says was built by his grandfather. The filmmakers, not accustomed to Norway's weather and terrain, barely make it to the top, while the much older Gaahl outpaces them all the way to the summit.

Snakes N' Barrels
Snakes N' Barrels (SnB) is Pickles' first band, all of whom (aside from Pickles) fell on hard times after Pickles went to Dethklok. The name of the band is a reference to the band Guns N' Roses (Possibly Rush as well, due to the album Snakes and Arrows), though the band members themselves are a comment on numerous bands, from their drastic physical changes to their poverty in later life (with the exception of Pickles). In season 3 the former members of the Dethklok tribute band Thunderhorse have made a Snakes N' Barrels cover band called Serpents N' Containers. Despite being Dethklok's drummer, Pickles was the SnB's lead singer and occasional rhythm guitarist.

Antonio "Tony" DiMarco Thunderbottom
 Voiced by: Arch Enemy guitarist Michael Amott
Antonio "Tony" DiMarco Thunderbottom is the bassist. He is a former alcoholic and drug addict turned sober. His signature top hat is reminiscent of Slash from Guns N' Roses, though his long hair and accent is a subtle representation of Mötley Crüe guitarist Mick Mars.

Sammy "Candynose" Twinskins
 Voiced by: Nevermore singer Warrel Dane
Sammy "Candynose" Twinskins is the drummer. He was formerly addicted to crack cocaine, but has since become sober. A young Candynose looks very much like Poison drummer Rikki Rockett.

Snizzy "Snazz" Bullets
 Voiced by: Nevermore guitarist Steve Smyth
Snizzy "Snazz" Bullets is the rhythm guitar player. He suffers from partial facial paralysis due to hallucinogens and heroin abuse; he is currently sober. He later invented a strapless guitar that functions as a girdle, known as a "g-girdle-uitar". The younger Bullets bears a strong resemblance to Joe Perry of Aerosmith. The older Bullets is bald, and bears the scars from a botched hair transplant on his head.

Rikki Kixx
 Voiced by: Mike Patton
Rikki Kixx (most likely an amalgam of Mötley Crüe bassist Nikki Sixx, Poison drummer Rikki Rockett and glam metal band Kix) is Pickles' replacement in the band. He hates the "living hell" that is sobriety and only promotes it just so people can suffer like he does. His appearance appears to be a parody of Pearl Jam frontman Eddie Vedder.

Roy Cornickelson
Voiced by: Mark Hamill

President of Crystal Mountain Records, the record company that publishes Dethklok, and one of the few people on Earth still powerful enough to have control over Dethklok.  At the beginning of Season 3, he seemed deathly ill, and his son Damien was running Crystal Mountain, using the label and Offdensen's absence to get revenge on Dethklok for humiliating him years ago.  As of "Dethsiduals", however, it seems Roy has recovered, again taking his position as head of the company.

After Mr. Salacia reveals his existence to Dethklok at the end of "Breakupklok", Cornickelson confronts him and is killed. He is given a funeral in the subsequent episode that becomes ambushed by the Revengencers, resulting in Cornickelson's body becoming disfigured.

The Revengencers
The Revengencers is an anti-Dethklok terrorist group formed by Edgar Jomfru and the Metal Masked Assassin in an attempt to exact revenge against Dethklok for the pain they have caused them (both their younger brothers were killed by Dethklok's minions). Though the organization was seemingly destroyed at the end of the second season, the Revengencers reappear in season four.

Metal Masked Assassin
 Voiced by: George "Corpsegrinder" Fisher
The Metal Masked Assassin, also called "The Man With the Silver Face" by Offdensen, is the brother of Agent 216, whom Crozier had sent to kill Dethklok in "Murdering Outside The Box" only to wind up stabbed through the mouth by Murderface's diamond-encrusted codpiece. Having been a psychopath all his life, having no family save his brother, he wears a metal mask and regularly dismembers people while they are still alive. General Crozier recruits him for the assault on the Dethwater concert, allowing the Assassin an opportunity to avenge his brother's death to suit his purpose. During the band's escape from the concert attack, the Assassin is able to separate Skwisgaar and Toki from the rest of the group. As he prepares to kill the guitarists, he is intercepted by Offdensen. After a short bout of hand and knife combat, he is quickly overcome by Offdensen, whose strength he had underestimated. His knife-wielding arm is broken and twisted to stab him in the kidney with his own weapon, and he is kicked into the freezing water nearby. He wears a silver metal mask, apparently attached to his face, hence the name "Man with the Silver Face." 

The Metal-Masked Assassin returns as the principal villain of the 2nd Season, now wearing a metal brace on his elbow and with a consuming hatred towards Offdensen, whom he wants to suffer before killing him. He becomes a founding member of the Revengencers. In "The Revengencers", he poses as a Klokateer guard during Dethklok's concert at St. Necrophagist to take Offdensen by surprise, only for Offdensen to miraculously survive a drop from an upper-story window. In "Black Fire Upon Us", having built up an army of Revengencers, the Assassin leads the assault on Mordhaus itself during the CD release party for the band's new album, personally firing the sonic cannon that brings Mordhaus' shields down and sets the house ablaze. During the ensuing battle, after Offdensen is shot down by the Death Mask teenager, the Assassin proceeds to brutally beat the manager and promising him torture. However, Nathan Explosion clubs the Assassin from behind with a flaming wooden beam, knocking him down with one blow. In "Bookklok", the Assassin resurfaces as the new leader of the Revengencers, attacking Dethklok at the end of the fourth season in conjunction with Magnus Hammersmith and kidnapping Toki and Abigail. He serves as the main antagonist of Metalocalypse: The Doomstar Requiem, where he is seen working with Hammersmith and plans to kill Dethklok inside his lair. Upon entering, the Assassin confronts Dethklok, but is distracted by Ishnifus. The Assassin then proceeds to kill Ishnifus, and impales Hammersmith for questioning his actions. The Assassin is killed by Dethklok who, upon rescuing Toki, destroy him while empowered by the Doomstar.

Edgar Jomfru
 Voiced by: Brendon Small
Wheelchair-bound Edgar Jomfru ("Jomfru" meaning virgin in Norwegian and Danish) and his brother Eric (voiced by Tommy Blacha) are introduced as the proprietors of diefordethklok.com, the largest Dethklok fan site. As revealed in Metalocalypse: The Doomstar Requiem, Edgar lost the use of his legs due to a car accident that occurred while he and his brother were returning from a Dethklok concert. In their greed, the brothers attempt to blackmail Dethklok into paying for good reviews on their site by secretly recording an exclusive one-time only song, "Fansong", played by Dethklok during their annual fan day. Their scheme fails miserably when the two brothers are lured into a sniper-filled hallway by Offdensen. Eric is killed instantly, his head blown off and the remnants of his face scattered on his brother, while Edgar, remembering Offdensen's cryptic advice regarding how to cross the narrow corridor beforehand, survives, only to be promptly imprisoned inside the band's dungeon.

Edgar returns in the 2nd Season as the secondary villain of the Season (the Metal-Masked Assassin acting as the main villain). The shock of his brother's death, as well as the brutal torture inflicted upon him by the band's minions, drives Edgar insane: having recovered the remains of his brother's face from the incident, he makes them into a mask for a fellow imprisoned fan who is put into his cell, even referring to the teen as his brother upon doing so. He digs his way out of the prison in the episode "Dethvengeance," the fan tied to his back despite the latter not being handicapped. He is rescued by the Metal Masked Assassin after escaping through the sewage system. He and the assassin start the Revengencers and begin orchestrating terrorist attacks on different Dethklok-related places. The Tribunal describes Edgar as the brains behind the terrorist attacks. He has his nose bitten off by a Dethklok fan while attempting to assassinate Nathan, in the episode "The Revengencers" aka "Sicklok".

In "Black Fire Upon Us", Edgar (having either regained or replaced his nose) masterminds the attack on Mordhaus and even infiltrates Mordhaus himself to personally kill Dethklok. He corners Skwisgaar and Pickles outside the house and prepares to shoot them with a shotgun. As he prepares to shoot them, the sight of Pickles and Skwisgaar causes him to flash back to all the years he and his brother spent as avid Dethklok fans. He lowers his gun as he is unable to kill what were once his idols. Immediately thereafter, a Klokateer kicks his wheelchair over and starts beating him with a night stick. He was eventually revealed to be alive and held within Mordhaus by Offdensen by his own plans. During the course of Season 4, Edgar searches for information regarding the prophecy surrounding Dethklok and eventually discovers that Dethklok "must go into the water". Though he despised Dethklok, especially their refusal to accept Toki as a brother, Edgar provided the band with gadgets to use for the rescue mission during the events of Metalocalypse: The Doomstar Requiem.

The Teenager
 Voiced by: Tommy Blacha
In "Dethvengance", a teenager is imprisoned and tortured by Klokateers after illegally downloading  Dethklok music. There he meets Edgar, who makes him wear a mask made of Eric Jomfru's face and refers to him as his brother. Edgar ties him to his back and escapes from Mordhaus. He joins the Revengencers with Edgar, never speaking and obeying Edgar without question. He participates in the attack on Mordhaus by shooting Offdensen with a crossbow as he is chased by Metal Masked Assassin. Shortly thereafter he is hit in the head by the butt of a rifle by General Crozier, knocked unconscious for the duration of the onslaught. In "Bookklok" it is shown that the teenager is alive and is part of the new Revengencers under the leadership of the Metal Masked Assassin.

Lavona Succuboso
 Voiced by: Angela Gossow of Arch Enemy
Lavona Succuboso leads the group "Succuboso Explosion", an extremist faction of women devoted to capturing Nathan Explosion and bearing his children, creating a race of warriors that will conquer the world. Their mantra is "We are the vessels that hold the future." They use a device called the "loin extractor" which is a harpoon-like projectile that attaches to the target's crotch and electrocutes them. It is unknown how the device actually "extracts" the loins, but when Lavona fired the weapon at Nathan during a concert, Murderface jumped in the way and was hit instead. Although the weapon did not actually hit Murderface's crotch, just his bass, he was mildly shocked and a charge was shot back through the weapon which sent Lavona flying completely out of the concert arena.

In "Black Fire Upon Us", Lavona and her followers have allied themselves with the Revengencers to help them attack Mordhaus during their CD release party. She made an agreement with Edgar Jomfru that she would get to have her way with Nathan before he is killed. She makes her way to the roof as Mordhaus burns and meets Nathan and a passed out Toki. She first attacks him, all the while making cryptic comments about having previously met Nathan, but is easily overpowered, causing her to kiss Nathan to get his guard down. She then knees him in the crotch and pulls out the "loin extractor" to finally complete her task. Before she can fire, Toki smashes his liquor bottle over her head, knocking her out. It is unclear whether or not she escaped the inferno of Mordhaus alive.

Magnus Hammersmith 
Voiced by: Marc Maron, Brendon Small (singing voice)
Magnus Hammersmith is a previous guitarist for Dethklok, holding the writing credits for the song "The Hammer" on Dethalbum III. Magnus is first briefly seen in the episode "RenovationKlok" where he is present in a flashback when the band first signs to Crystal Mountain Records. He appears again in the episode "Dethcamp" where it is revealed that Magnus was egomaniacal and kicked out of the band after a fight with Nathan Explosion. The day after he was kicked out, Magnus trashed his former bandmates' equipment with writing "Revenge is coming" on the wall in blood. While Magnus works as a counsellor in Roc-a-Rooni Fantasy Camp, he becomes friends with his replacement Toki Wartooth, who attends the camp in a desperate attempt to make friends. Though he appeared to have reconciled with Dethklok, Magnus is revealed to be a member of the Revengencers. In "Church of the Black Klok", Magnus reveals his true colors while stabbing Toki, but kept him alive alongside Abigail so he can exact his revenge on Dethklok during the events of Metalocalypse: The Doomstar Requiem. However, impaled by the Assassin after questioning his choice to kill Ishnifus, Magnus witnesses the true power that Dethklok holds. Realizing that he was the villain all along for kidnapping Toki, Magnus commits suicide as a way to repent for his actions.

References

List
Metalocalypse